The Swingin' Pig Records was a bootleg label that mostly released LPs and singles, best known for unauthorized recordings of The Beatles, Led Zeppelin and The Rolling Stones. The first publications were made in the early 1980s, when they released three singles and about twenty LPs. The label became one of the first to release bootleg CDs, the first to offer bootleg CDs in high-quality box sets. A sublabel, Magic Dwarf Records, offered records from the Beatles and Rolling Stones in 1988.

By 1985, the label had its headquarters in Luxembourg and distributed its recordings from Germany via the small record label Perfect Beat Tonträger, in Brakel. By the 1990s, GEMA fees were paid, artists were unable to collect because in some European countries the rights for the artists had expired after 20 or 25 years. The label disappeared from the market in the mid-1990s, around the time WIPO became law. Remaining stocks were processed through Soundhouse Music.

The LP / CD Box Atlantic City '89 was the label's most popular release, a digital recording of a live concert by the Rolling Stones over satellite broadcast. The band tried to ban the publication several times; in 1991 there were several court hearings before the regional court in Hamburg, with distribution was banned for a short time. On March 22, 1991, the regional court lifted the ban. At over 70,000 copies, it may be the best-selling bootleg in the world.

A total of around 250 CDs and 150 LPs were released, as well as three singles and two shape vinyls from the Rolling Stones. A few legitimate authorized promo recordings were released. Most of the LPs were also made on limited-edition colored vinyl.

The following list is an overview of known releases, including the first bootlegs and special pressings. The Swingin 'Pig Records discontinued production with TSP 223–2; any records beyond this are fakes, mostly from Thailand, banking on the name recognition.

Due to the legal situation at the time, artists from countries that did not sign the Rome Agreement were only granted the rights that German artists had in the respective country (principle of reciprocity). In the early 1990s several court cases ruled the unauthorized releases legal. Today, reselling may not be.

External links 
  
 The Swingin’ Pig Net – Website for fans and collectors 
 Stereoplay Musik-Kritik und Hintergründe zu Rolling Stones – Atlantic City ’89

References 

Record labels
Bootleg recordings